Highway 90 is the debut album by guitarist Shane Theriot. It was released in 2000.

Track listing

 "It Ain't My Fault"
 "Pump"
 "Trashy"
 "Highway 90"
 "The Street Beater (Theme From Sanford and Son)"
 "Punch"
 "Shiho"
 "1321 N. Las Palmas"
 "Stampy"
 "Bayou Chicken"
 "Cabildo Breeze"

Personnel

 Shane Theriot - guitar, composer, producer, additional snare drum, rubboard
 Victor Wooten - bass
 "Mean" Willie Green - drums
 Adam Nitti - bass
 Tom Reynolds - keys
 Paul Chapman - bass
 J.D. Blair - drums
 Kim Stone - bass
 Jo-El Sonnier - accordion
 Jim Roberts - co-producer, percussion
 Eric Struthers - guitar
 Johnny Neel - organ
 Neal Cappellino - mixing/engineer

References

2000 debut albums